Charles "Gordon" Stone (6 April 1914 – 7 February 2015) was an Australian rugby union player.

Career 
Stone was born in the Eastern Suburbs of Sydney, where he played rugby on the oval of the nearby Coast Hospital. He attended Sydney Boys High School, where he continued playing rugby and was selected for the school's First XV.

Upon completing his schooling in 1933, he joined the Randwick DRUFC (known as the 'Galloping Greens'), with whom he played 93 matches. In 1938, he received state selection, playing seven matches for the New South Wales Waratahs. He also was selected for the national team, the Wallabies, in the same year, playing one Bledisloe Cup match against the New Zealand All Blacks on 23 July 1938.

References

External links
ESPN Scrum profile

1914 births
2015 deaths
Australia international rugby union players
New South Wales Waratahs players
Rugby union players from Sydney
Australian centenarians
Men centenarians
People educated at Sydney Boys High School
Rugby union scrum-halves